Wolfgang Lück (born 19 February 1957 in Herford) is a German mathematician who is an internationally recognized expert in algebraic topology.

Life and work 

After receiving his Abitur from the Ravensberger Gymnasium in Herford in 1975, he studied at the University of Göttingen where he obtained his Diplom in 1981 and his doctoral degree under Tammo tom Dieck in 1984. His thesis was entitled Eine allgemeine Beschreibung für Faserungen auf projektiven Klassengruppen und Whiteheadgruppen.

From 1982 on he was research assistant and from 1985 on he was assistant in Göttingen. In 1989 Lück received his Habilitation. From 1990–91, he was associate professor at the University of Kentucky in Lexington. From 1991 until 1996, he was professor at the University of Mainz, and from 1996 until 2010 he taught at the University of Münster. Since 2010 he has been a professor at the University of Bonn. In 2003, he was awarded the Max Planck Research Award and in 2008 the Gottfried Wilhelm Leibniz Prize.

Lück has made significant contributions in topology; he and his coauthors resolved many cases of the Farrell-Jones conjecture and the Borel conjecture. He has also contributed to the development of the theory of L2-invariants (such as L2-Betti numbers and L2-cohomology) of manifolds, which were originally introduced by Michael Atiyah and are defined by means of operator algebras. These invariants have applications in group theory and geometry.

In 2009 and 2010 Lück was president of the German Mathematical Society, whose vice president he had been since 2006. From 2011 until 2017, he was Director of the Hausdorff Research Institute for Mathematics (HIM) in Bonn. In 2012, he became a fellow of the American Mathematical Society.

Selected publications 
 
 
 
 
 L2 Invarianten von Mannigfaltigkeiten und Gruppen, Jahresbericht DMV, Bd.99, 1997, Heft 3
 
 Editor together with F. Thomas Farrell and Lothar Göttsche: Topology of high-dimensional manifolds, ICTP Lecture Notes, 2002

References

External links 
 
 
 
 
 

1957 births
Living people
20th-century German mathematicians
Gottfried Wilhelm Leibniz Prize winners
Academic staff of the University of Münster
Fellows of the American Mathematical Society
People from Herford
University of Kentucky faculty
Academic staff of Johannes Gutenberg University Mainz
Academic staff of the University of Bonn
University of Göttingen alumni
Academic staff of the University of Göttingen
Topologists
21st-century German mathematicians
Presidents of the German Mathematical Society